Elizabeth Wilford (died 1559) was an English businessperson.

She was the daughter of Thomas Gale of London (d. 1540), a member of the Haberdasher’s Company, and Elizabeth Wilkinson (d. 1546). In 1529, she married Nicholas Wilford of London and Wardsworth, Surrey (c. 1495 – August 1551) a Merchant Taylor, with whom she had eleven children. 

Upon the death of her father, she inherited a capital tenement with four smaller houses and adjacent shops in the parish of St. George, Botolph Lane. After the death of her spouse in 1551, she inherited all his freehold lands, and became active in business, most notably as an importer of cloth. She was one of two women of the 201 founding members of the Muscovy Company in 1555, and the only woman to invest in the Muscovy Company independently of a husband. She was a successful businessperson, and at the time of her death, her estate was valued in excess of £1000.

References

1559 deaths
16th-century English businesswomen
People of the Muscovy Company